Milaine Cloutier  (born February 16, 1972 in Granby, Quebec) is a badminton player from Canada, who won the gold medal in the women's doubles competition at the 1999 Pan American Games alongside Robbyn Hermitage. A resident of Calgary, Alberta, she represented Canada at the 2000 Summer Olympics.

References
 Canadian Olympic Committee

1972 births
Living people
Badminton players at the 1998 Commonwealth Games
Badminton players at the 2002 Commonwealth Games
Badminton players at the 1995 Pan American Games
Badminton players at the 1999 Pan American Games
Badminton players at the 2000 Summer Olympics
Canadian female badminton players
Commonwealth Games competitors for Canada
French Quebecers
Medalists at the 1995 Pan American Games
Medalists at the 1999 Pan American Games
Olympic badminton players of Canada
Pan American Games gold medalists for Canada
Pan American Games medalists in badminton
People from Granby, Quebec
Sportspeople from Quebec
20th-century Canadian women
21st-century Canadian women